War Chamber is a professional wrestling supercard event produced by Major League Wrestling (MLW). The event was first held in 2019 as a television taping for MLW's weekly program, Fusion. The event is a successor and replacement for MLW WarGames, after WWE acquired the rights to the name of the namesake WarGames match for its NXT brand.

Dates and venues

References

Major League Wrestling shows